Syndicate is an isometric real-time tactical and strategic game from Bullfrog Productions created in 1993, and released for a variety of platforms beginning with the PC and Commodore Amiga. It is the first title in the Syndicate series. Set in a dystopian future in which corporations have replaced governments, Syndicate puts the player in control of a corporation vying for global dominance.

The game consists of a series of missions, in which the player controls a team of cybernetically modified agents attempting to take control of a particular country. The agents must frequently overcome local police forces and heavily armed agents from rival syndicates to achieve mission objectives, which range from assassinations to capture or rescue of personnel. Agent armaments, cybernetic modifications and behavioral attributes can be controlled by the player to make them more suited for particular tasks.

The player corporation makes money through taxes gathered from occupied territories, which can be used to research and purchase more potent weaponry and cybernetic modifications. The player controls the level of taxation, with  excessive taxation bringing the risk of revolt, requiring a further mission to re-capture the territory.

The game was critically acclaimed upon release, with particular praise for the realistic presentation, writing and violence of the gameplay. It cemented Bullfrog's reputation following its early successes with the Populous series and Powermonger.

An expansion pack, Syndicate: American Revolt, a sequel, Syndicate Wars, and a reboot Syndicate have also been released. The original game and expansion pack were re-released together in 1996 as Syndicate Plus.

Gameplay

Gameplay of Syndicate involves ordering a one to four-person team of cyborg agents around cities displayed in a fixed-view isometric style, in pursuit of mission goals such as assassinating executives of a rival syndicate, rescuing captured allies, "persuading" civilians and scientists to join the player's company or killing all enemy agents.

As the player progresses through the game, they must manage the research and development of new weaponry and cyborg upgrades. The player has limited funds, requiring taxation of the conquered territories. Over-taxed territories may revolt, resulting in the loss of that territory and requiring the replay of that mission. The player begins the game with pistols, progressing through increasingly destructive weaponry that includes Uzis, miniguns, flamethrowers, sniper rifles, time bombs, lasers and the destructive Gauss gun. In addition, the player can use items such as medikits to heal their agents, scanners to locate pedestrians/vehicles and the "Persuadertron" to brainwash the player's targets into blind obedience.

Plot
The backstory of Syndicate is contained in the manual, instead of the game itself. As multinational corporations gained power and influence they came to exercise direct influence over the world's governments, eventually replacing them, controlling the lives of people through commerce. One such "megacorp", named EuroCorp, invented the "CHIP", a device inserted into the neck which alters a person's perception of the outside world, numbing their senses to the misery and squalor around them. It also opened the user to suggestion and manipulation by the megacorps. Before long the megacorps became corrupt crime Syndicates, fighting amongst each other for monopoly over CHIP manufacturing and control over populations.

The game puts the player in charge of a self-named corporation in a near-future cyberpunk-style world in the year 2096. The teams of up to four cyborg agents - who according to the game's intro cutscene, are ordinary civilians who have been captured, cybernetically enhanced and reprogrammed. The agents are used in a series of missions, which include assassinations, infiltration, theft and "persuasion" (using a device called a Persuadertron to capture individuals of importance, or hordes of civilians, police and others to act as cannon fodder). New agents can also be Persuaded and added to the player's roster, to replace those who have been injured or killed. Losing all agents results in a Game Over screen, as the player's corporation sets the player's control airship to self destruct and crash.

During the course of the game, the player establishes worldwide dominance with their established syndicate, one territory at a time, while engaging and eliminating rival syndicates (such as The Tao, Sphinx Inc., and The Castrilos) and putting down internal mutinies. The finale sees the squad eliminating wave upon wave of enemy agents on the Atlantic Accelerator research station: victory declares the dawn of a new Empire across the Earth.

Release
The game appeared in 1993 on the Amiga and PC DOS computers and was subsequently ported across to a wide variety of other formats. The DOS version used the standard 320x200 256-color resolution (Mode 13h) just for the planning and main menus, with the tactical simulation part rendered at 640x480 with only 16 colors. The higher resolution permitted finer detail in the graphics and allowed for the illusion that more than 16 colors were used by means of dithering. Similar graphics and same levels design were used in the Macintosh, 3DO, Atari Jaguar and RiscPC ports.

A separate version was made for the simpler, 16-bit consoles, as the hardware could not support the complexity of the original game. It contained new level design and different graphics, and was released for Sega Mega Drive and SNES. Later, it was released on the PlayStation Portable as part of EA Replay, a compilation of retro games released in the United States on November 7, 2006; this version is the SNES version and is executed on PSP by an emulator.

In January 2012, the DOS version of Syndicate was re-released, packaged with pre-configured versions of the DOSBox emulator for both OS X and modern versions of Windows. In 2015, Syndicate was available for free on Electronic Arts' Origin platform.

An expansion pack named, Syndicate: American Revolt, was subsequently released in 1993.

Reception

Computer Gaming World criticized the lack of multiplayer, random research, poor AI, and repetitive missions. The magazine concluded that "Syndicate is a polished and significant effort" that would appeal to fans of other Bullfrog games but "doesn't quite offer the staying power of its predecessors". COMPUTE! noted, "This isn't a game to use as a morality lesson for the kids – it's bloody, it requires you to be ruthless, and some people may take issue with the use of drugs to control your agents. But it's a ball to play."

GamePro described the Genesis version as a "clumsy translation", remarking that targeting and maneuvering are much more difficult with gamepad button combinations, and that the graphics aren't clear enough for the player to make out essential details. Next Generation reviewed the Genesis version of the game, and stated that "Often the intense strategy games of the PC domain never make much of a 16bit game and Syndicate is a prime example."

The four reviewers of Electronic Gaming Monthly concurred that the Jaguar version was the best home console version of the game to date, but still clearly inferior to the PC version. They especially criticized the use of the Jaguar controller's number pad, saying it made the controls needlessly complicated. GamePro instead actually praised the use of the Jaguar controller's many buttons, but also remarked that the Jaguar version suffers from a hard-to-read display and sharp, erratic slowdown. A reviewer for Next Generation disagreed with both of them, saying that the Jaguar version is "as close to the original title as is possible without the use of a mouse." They applauded the game in general for its detailed gore and "oppressive atmosphere."

Next Generation also published a positive review for the 3DO version, with the reviewer commenting, "There's been a version of this for nearly every system, and it has to be said this one takes a close second behind that found on PC. ... easily the best looking and smoothest controlling version for any home system." Despite this, he gave it a lower score than the Jaguar version. Next Generation reviewed the 3DO version of the game again, and stated that "Of all the versions we've looked at, this is a close second behind the PC, noticeably better than the Jaguar, and miles ahead of the Genesis and Sega CD versions. Otherwise, it's exactly the same."

GamePro gave the SNES version an overall positive review based on the depth of the gameplay, calling it "a thinking man's shoot-em-up game."

Next Generation reviewed the Macintosh version of the game, and stated that "players who enjoy being the Greedy, Amoral, Corporate Bastard are in for a satisfying depraved chunk of murder."

Accolades 

In 1996, Computer Gaming World ranked it as the 67th best PC game of all time, stating that "it was just fun to mow down civilians in this strategic action game of futuristic gang warfare." That same year, Next Generation ranked it as the 29th top game of all time for being "fast, furious and tons of fun" in spite of its complexity. Also in 1996, Syndicate was ranked as the seventh best Amiga game by Amiga Power. In 2010, UGO.com included the game on its list of 42 best games ever made. It was also included in the 2011 list of the best violent video games of all time by The Daily Telegraph for the reason that "few games have ever been so keen to have their protagonists murder civilians, burning them with flamethrowers, blowing them up with rocket launchers and simply mowing them down." That same year, Wirtualna Polska ranked it as the third best Amiga game. In 1994, PC Gamer US named Syndicate as the 16th best computer game ever. The editors hailed it as "slick, addictive, and one-of-a-kind gaming."" That same year, PC Gamer UK named it the 11th best computer game of all time. The editors wrote, "Very few titles provide an atmosphere as dark and seductive as the one in Syndicate, and it strikes just the right balance between strategy and arcade blasting." In 1995, Total! ranked the game 37th on their Top 100 SNES Games writing: "Bullfrog deliver heaps of moody atmosphere in this bleak futuristic shooter.  It’s gripping and a little dangerous." In 1996, GamesMaster ranked the 3DO version 8th in its "The GamesMaster 3DO Top 10." In the same magazine, they also ranked the game 22nd in their "Top 100 Games of All Time."

Legacy
Syndicate Wars is a 1996 direct sequel to Syndicate, featuring 3D graphics and released for the PC and PlayStation. Several attempts by Bullfrog to produce another Syndicate game were all ultimately abandoned. These canceled games included at least one for the PC and another for the PlayStation 2. The game was re-imagined by Starbreeze Studios as Syndicate, a first-person shooter released for the PC, PlayStation 3 and Xbox 360 in 2012. A spiritual successor, Satellite Reign, was developed by some of the original staff.

References

External links 
 Syndicate at MobyGames
 Syndicate at the Hall of Light
 FreeSynd (a game engine recreation of the game)
 Official website of the Acorn RiscPC version
 Demo version for the Acorn RiscPC

1993 video games
2096
3DO Interactive Multiplayer games
Acorn Archimedes games
Amiga games
Atari Jaguar games
Bullfrog Productions games
Amiga CD32 games
Classic Mac OS games
Cyberpunk video games
DOS games
FM Towns games
Games commercially released with DOSBox
NEC PC-9801 games
Ocean Software games
Organized crime video games
Real-time tactics video games
Science fiction video games
Sega CD games
Sega Genesis games
Super Nintendo Entertainment System games
Video games scored by Russell Shaw
Video games set in the 2090s
Video games with expansion packs
Video games with isometric graphics
Windows games
Mindscape games
Video games developed in the United Kingdom